Okacha Hamzaoui (born 29 November 1990) is an Algerian footballer who plays for Fujairah FC.

Club career
On 17 June 2016, Hamzaoui signed a two-year contract with C.D. Nacional. In 2019,  Hamzaoui signed a contract with USM Bel Abbès.
In 2021, he joined CS Constantine.
In 2022, he joined Fujairah FC.

International career
In June 2011, Hamzaoui was called up for the first time to the Algeria national under-23 football team by Azzedine Aït Djoudi for a two-week training camp in preparation for the 2011 CAF U-23 Championship. However, he did not make the final squad.

In 2015, Hamzaoui was a member of the Algeria military national football team that won the gold medal at the 2015 Military World Games.

Career statistics

Club

Honours
Tractor
Hazfi Cup (1): 2019–20
National team Algerian  gold medal at the 2015 Military World Games.

References
1. Tractor Signs Algerian Okacha Hamzaoui January 19, 2020

2.Feirenes vs. Nacional Soccerway. Retrieved 24 September 2016.

3. Vitoria Guimaraes vs. Nacional Soccerway. Retrieved 24 March 2016.

4. Tractor vs. Zob Ahan Soccerway. Retrieved 31 January 2020.

5. MO Béjaïa vs. El Eulma Soccerway. Retrieved 23 May 2015.

6. http://www.ceroacero.es/player.php?id=324810&search=1&search_string=okacha+hamzaoui+&searchdb=1

7. Ogol Profile

8. https://www.bdfutbol.com/en/j/j29154.html

External links
 
Okacha Hamzaoui at FootballDatabase.eu
Okacha Hamzaoui at National-Football-Teams.com
 
Okacha Hamzaoui on Instagram

1990 births
Living people
Algerian expatriate footballers
Algerian footballers
Algerian Ligue Professionnelle 1 players
Algerian Ligue 2 players
Primeira Liga players
C.D. Nacional players
MO Béjaïa players
JS Saoura players
USM Bel Abbès players
USM Alger players
People from Aïn Kermes
Association football forwards
Algerian expatriate sportspeople in Portugal
Expatriate footballers in Portugal
21st-century Algerian people